Club Social Deportivo Estrella Azul (sometimes referred as Estrella Azul) is a Peruvian football club, playing in the city of Ventanilla, Callao, Peru.

History
The Club Estrella Azul was founded on May 4, 1974.

In 2015 Copa Perú, the club classified to the Departamental Stage, but was eliminated by Cantolao in the Second Stage.

In 2019 Copa Perú, the club classified to the Regional Stage, but was eliminated when finished in 47th place.

In 2021 Copa Perú, the club classified to the National Stage, but was eliminated when finished in 8th place.

Honours

Regional
Liga Departamental de Callao:
Winners (1): 2019
Runner-up (3): 1984, 1990, 2022

Liga Distrital de Ventanilla:
Winners (6): 1981, 1982, 1984, 1990, 2013, 2015
Runner-up (8): 1985, 1988, 1997, 2002, 2005, 2012, 2014, 2019

See also
List of football clubs in Peru
Peruvian football league system

References

External links
 
 

Football clubs in Peru
Association football clubs established in 1974
1974 establishments in Peru